Joseph-Aukuso Sua'ali'i (born 1 August 2003) is a Samoa international rugby league footballer who plays as a  or  for the Sydney Roosters in the NRL.

Described as a teen prodigy, Sua'ali'i received significant media attention during contract negotiations in 2020. In 2021, he was granted an exemption to play in the NRL prior to his 18th birthday, prompting discussions about the welfare of young players.

Background
Sua'ali'i was born in Penrith, a suburb of Sydney, New South Wales, the son of a Samoan father and an Australian mother of Cambodian and European heritage.

He grew up playing rugby league for the Glenmore Park Brumbies and then moved to the Coogee Wombats from age 12.

Sua'ali'i attended Regentville Public School and attended The King's School, Parramatta. Joseph set the Australian 12-year-old male high jump record in 2015.

Career 
In 2018, Sua'ali'i played rugby league for the South Sydney Rabbitohs in the Harold Matthews Cup (under 16s). He played rugby union as a fullback for The King's School's 1st XV from the age of 14, and in 2018 was selected to represent the GPS 1st XV, and the NSW Schoolboys and Australian Schoolboys in rugby sevens.

In February 2019, Sua'ali'i re-signed with the Rabbitohs until the end of the 2021 season. He captained the Harold Matthews Cup team in 2019, scoring 15 tries in 9 matches, and was named the Harold Matthews Cup Player of the Year.

Conflicting reports in mid-2020 suggested that Sua'ali'i had agreed to a multi-million dollar contract with either the Rabbitohs, or Rugby Australia, which they denied. In discussions with both those enitities, Sua'ali'i reportedly wanted 'get out' clauses available in his favour.

In November 2020, it was reported that the Sydney Roosters had signed Sua'ali'i from 2022 onwards, with the 'get out' clauses having been accepted by the club. The signing was officially announced on 1 December, with Sua'ali'i joining the Roosters effective immediately after he was released from the final year of his Rabbitohs contract.

2021 
Sua'ali'i made his debut for North Sydney in round 1 of the 2021 NSW Cup season. Sua'ali'i scored two tries in North Sydney's 48–20 loss to the Blacktown Workers Sea Eagles.

On 15 March 2021, the ARL Commission granted Sua'ali'i an exemption to play in the NRL before turning 18 years old. At age 17 years and 294 days, Sua'ali'i was the first player since Jason Taumalolo in 2010 to debut prior to their 18th birthday. Sua'ali'i scored his first NRL try the following week as the Sydney Roosters defeated the Canberra Raiders in round 12.

On 14 July, Sua'ali'i was ruled out for the remainder of the 2021 NRL season with a foot injury.

2022
In round 9 of the 2022 NRL season, Sua'ali'i scored two tries for the Sydney Roosters in their 44-16 victory over the Gold Coast. The following week, Sua'ali'i scored a further two tries in the club’s 31-24 victory over Parramatta. In May, Sua'ali'i was selected in the New South Wales 22-man squad for Game One of the State of Origin series.

In October Sua'ali'i was named in the Samoa squad for the 2021 Rugby League World Cup.
He played in every game for Samoa at the tournament including the final where they lost 30-10 against Australia.

References

External links

Sydney Roosters profile
Samoa profile

2003 births
Living people
Australian rugby league players
Australian people of Cambodian descent
Australian sportspeople of Samoan descent
Rugby league fullbacks
Rugby league players from Penrith, New South Wales
Rugby league wingers
Rugby league centres
Rugby league five-eighths
Sydney Roosters players
North Sydney Bears NSW Cup players